Tony Woolmer (born 25 March 1946) is an English former footballer who played in the Football League for Norwich City, Bradford Park Avenue and Scunthorpe United.

References

English footballers
English Football League players
1946 births
Living people
Norwich City F.C. players
Bradford (Park Avenue) A.F.C. players
Scunthorpe United F.C. players
Footballers from Norwich
King's Lynn F.C. players
Association football forwards